There are several saints named Andronicus:

Andronicus of Pannonia — an Apostle of the Seventy mentioned in Romans 16:7
Andronicus of Tarsus in Cilicia — a fourth-century martyr
Andronicus of Egypt — a 5th-century ascetic
Andronicus the Abbot of Moscow — a 14th-century disciple of Saint Sergius of Radonezh